W Orionis is a carbon star in the constellation Orion, approximately  away.  It varies regularly in brightness between extremes of magnitude 4.4 and 6.9 roughly every 7 months.

Variability
W Orionis is a semiregular variable with an approximately 212‑day cycle.  A long secondary period of 2,450 days has also been reported.

Properties
The angular diameter of W Orionis has been measured using interferometry and a value of 9.7 mas is found.  Although it is known to be a pulsating variable star, no changes in the diameter were seen.

Technetium has not been detected in W Orionis, an unexpected result since this s-process element should be dredged up in all thermally-pulsating AGB stars and especially in carbon stars.

References

External links
W Orionis Kaler's Stars
Astronomy Picture of the Day

Orion (constellation)
Orionis, W
032736
023680
Durchmusterung objects
Semiregular variable stars
Carbon stars